{{Infobox CBB Team
|current = 2022–23 Mount St. Mary's Mountaineers men's basketball team
|name = Mount St. Mary's Mountaineers
|logo = Mount Saint Mary's M.png
|logo_size = 150
|university = Mount St. Mary's University
|conference = MAAC
|location = Emmitsburg, Maryland
|coach = Dan Engelstad
|tenure = 3rd
|arena = Knott Arena
|capacity = 3,121
|nickname = Mountaineers
|h_body= 07294D
|h_pattern_b=_thinsidesonwhite
|h_shorts= 07294D
|h_pattern_s=_blanksides2
|a_body= 07294D
|a_pattern_b=_thinwhitesides
|a_shorts= 07294D
|a_pattern_s=_whitesides
|NCAAchampion =1962*
|NCAArunnerup = 1981*
|NCAAfinalfour = 1957*, 1961*, 1962*, 1981*, 1985*
|NCAAeliteeight = 1957*, 1961*, 1962*, 1981*, 1985*
|NCAAsweetsixteen = 1957*, 1961*, 1962*, 1969*, 1981*, 1982*, 1985*, 1986*, 1987*
|NCAAsecondround = 
|NCAAtourneys = 1957*, 1961*, 1962*, 1963*, 1967*, 1969*, 1970*, 1979*, 1980*, 1981*, 1982*, 1985*, 1986*, 1987*, 1995, 1999, 2008, 2014, 2017, 2021*at Division II level
|conference_tournament =Mason–Dixon Conference1944, 1954, 1955, 1956, 1957, 1961, 1962, 1963, 1967, 1986, 1988

Northeast Conference1995, 1999, 2008, 2014, 2017, 2021''
|conference_season = 1996, 2017
}}

The Mount St. Mary's Mountaineers men's basketball team''' represents Mount St. Mary's University in Emmitsburg, Maryland, United States. The team's current head coach is Dan Engelstad. It competed in the Northeast Conference from 1989 until July 1, 2022, after which, they will join the Metro Atlantic Athletic Conference. The Mountaineers play their home games at Knott Arena. The team has played in five NCAA Division I men's basketball tournaments by virtue of winning the NEC tournament. They were NCAA Division II National Champions in 1962 and NCAA Division II runner-up in 1981.

Mount Saint Mary's basketball program is likely best known for the career of head coach Jim Phelan, who coached at Mount St. Mary's for 49 years, compiling 830 wins in 1,354 games. He was inducted into the National Collegiate Basketball Hall of Fame in 2008.

Postseason results

NCAA Division I Tournament results
The Mountaineers have played six previous NCAA Division I Tournaments. Their combined record is 2–6.

NCAA Division II Tournament results
The Mountaineers have appeared in the NCAA Division II Tournament 14 times. Their combined record is 25–17.

NIT results
The Mountaineers have appeared in the National Invitation Tournament (NIT) one time. Their record is 0–1.

CIT results
The Mountaineers have appeared in the CollegeInsider.com Postseason Tournament (CIT) one time. Their record is 0–1.

Mountaineers in professional basketball
The following Mountaineer players have played in the NBA:
Fred Carter
Bob Riley

The following Mountaineer players have played in other professional leagues:
John F. Sullivan, American Basketball League[Junior robinson] Euro league

See also
Jim Phelan Award

References

External links